On Camera was a Canadian dramatic anthology television series which aired on CBC Television from 1954 to 1958.

Premise
Various dramatic and comedic works were featured in On Camera, as written or adapted by Canadian writers.

Scheduling
This half-hour series was broadcast for four seasons as follows:

Episodes
Featured plays and presentations during On Camera'''s series run included:

 "Absentee Murder" (Charles Templeton)
 "The Almighty Voice" (a censored version of George Salverson's radio play Blasphemy'')
 "Blind Date" (Jacqueline Rosenfeld)
 "Mr. Gidding Attacks" (Henry Feisen)
 "Gold Mine in the House" (J. N. Harris story; Sidney Furie adaptation)
 "The Guests" (Jack Benthover)
 "The Last Long Crusade" (Doris French)
 "Markheim" (Robert Louis Stevenson story)
 "The President's Ghost" (Michael Sheldon)
 "Stagecoach Bride" (Elsie Park Gowan)
 "Thank You, Edmondo" (Mac Shoub)
 "Two From King Street" (Jack Kuper)
 "Waltz" (Stanley Mann)
 "Who Destroyed The Earth" (Len Peterson)

Hugh Garner and Joseph Schull also wrote for the series. Episode producers included Paul Almond, Arthur Hiller, Charles Jarrott and Ted Kotcheff.

References

External links
 
 

CBC Television original programming
1950s Canadian anthology television series
1954 Canadian television series debuts
1958 Canadian television series endings
Black-and-white Canadian television shows